The Canfield Ocean model was proposed by geochemist Donald Canfield to explain the composition of the ocean in the middle to late Proterozoic.

In a paper published in 1998 in Nature, Canfield argued that the ocean was anoxic and sulfidic during the time of the Boring Billion, and that those conditions affected the mineral deposition of iron-rich banded iron formations (BIF). Prior to the Canfield Ocean theory, it was believed that the ocean became oxygenated during the Great Oxygenation Event. The presence of oxygen in the deep ocean made the formation of BIF impossible, which is seen in ocean sediment records. Conversely, the Canfield Ocean theory postulates that deep ocean water remained anoxic long after the Great Oxidation Event, and he argued that the euxinic conditions in the deep ocean ceased the deposition of BIF in ocean sediments.

Definition
Euxinic describes anoxic conditions in the presence of  hydrogen sulfide. Euxinic ocean conditions, a term describing restricted hydrologic circulation that lead to stagnant or anaerobic conditions, are the likely factor leading to sulfidic oceans.

See also

References

Geology theories
Proterozoic